The Improved Industrial Dwellings Company (IIDC) was a Victorian Model dwellings company founded in 1863 by the printer, philanthropist and later Lord Mayor of London Sir Sydney Waterlow. The company operated predominantly in Central London as a provider of block dwellings for the working classes, employing a strict selection and discipline regime amongst its tenants to ensure a healthy return on investment. Starting with a capital of £50,000, the IIDC became one of the largest and most successful of the model dwellings companies, housing at its height around 30,000 individuals.

Waterlow's example was influential.  The Newcastle Upon Tyne Improved Industrial Dwellings Company was set up by James Hall of Hall Brothers Steamship Company, Tynemouth, after visiting Sir Sydney Waterlow's establishment in London.

Buildings
Waterlow worked with the builder Matthew Allen, choosing not to use an architect. Blocks built by the IIDC include:
Marlborough Buildings, Chelsea
Huntingdon Buildings, Bethnal Green
Leopold Buildings, Bethnal Green
Sandringham Buildings, Charing Cross
Cromwell Buildings, Southwark
Langbourn Buildings, Finsbury
Clarendon Flats, Mayfair
Cobden Buildings, Kings Cross Road, Islington (1865)
Ambrosden Avenue, Devil's Acre, Westminster
Derby Buildings, Britannia Street, Camden
Old Tower Buildings, Brewhouse Lane, Wapping (1864)
Compton Buildings, Finsbury (1871)
New Tower Buildings, Wapping High Street, Wapping (1886)

There were others in Old St Pancras Road, Wapping, Greenwich and Islington.

See also
List of existing model dwellings

References

Housing in London
Philanthropic organisations based in the United Kingdom
Organizations established in 1863
1863 establishments in the United Kingdom